Daniel Tobin (born January 13, 1958) is an American poet, scholar, editor, and essayist, and the winner of numerous awards for his work, including fellowships from the National Endowment for the Arts, the John Simon Guggenheim Foundation, the Massachusetts Books Award, and the Julia Ward Howe Award, among many others.

Life 
Daniel Tobin was born in Bay Ridge, Brooklyn, New York to Gerard Tobin and Helen Ruane Tobin. Both parents were of Irish ancestry, and his upbringing in Brooklyn and his ancestral links to Ireland inform his poetry, scholarship, and teaching. He graduated from Xaverian High School before attending Iona College where he graduated with a B.A. in Religious Studies, as well as in Psychology. He also graduated from Harvard University with a Master of Theological Studies, from Warren Wilson College with an M.F.A. in Poetry, and from the University of Virginia with a Ph.D. in Religion and Literature. He has taught at James Madison University in Virginia, Carthage College in Wisconsin, the School of the Art Institute of Chicago, and the Program for Writers at Warren Wilson College, with which he maintains an affiliation.  He is presently Professor of Writing, Literature and Publishing at Emerson College in Boston, where he served previously as Department Chair and Interim Dean of the School of the Arts. He is a citizen of both America and Ireland where he keeps close personal and professional ties. He is married to poet and scholar, Christine Casson

Reception of the Poetry 
Daniel Tobin's poems have appeared in a myriad of journals, from The Times Literary Supplement to The Paris Review to Poetry, and hundreds of others on both sides in America and Europe, as well as in more than fifty anthologies, including The Norton Introduction to Poetry.

Tobin's first book of poems, Where the World is Made, won the Katherine Bakeless Nason Prize.  The poems reveal a quest for transcendence with a strong theological impulse, though without appeal to dogma.  The judge of the award, Ellen Bryant Voigt, called the book “a musical Bildungroman… a first book of remarkable authority.” Edward Hirsch praised the book as a “work profoundly alert to spiritual matters” composed of ‘finely wrought poems… in search of the sacred,” and Eleanor Wilner viewed the poems as “darkly devotional… unsparing, unsparing at times harrowing in their awareness.” Double Life followed Where the World is Made, a book that gained particular praise for its polyphonic sequence on the life of the Spanish plantation master turned friar, Bartolome de las Casas, and its “Homage to Bosh,” a long ekphrastic poem based on the paintings of Hieronymous Bosh. Eamonn Wall described The Narrows, Tobin's third book which he describes as a “mural in verse” as “a prodigious feat of raw physical, moral, psychic and literary energy.”  Of the book B.H Fairchild wrote: “All stories of arrival and survival in America are the American story, but rarely are they told as compellingly as this one… a poem of narrative power and astonishing lyric depth and grace.” A review of Second Things, his fourth book, marked Tobin as fast becoming “one of the best poets of his generation.” Belated Heavens, in turn, won the Massachusetts Book Award. Of The Net, Tobin's sixth book of poems, David Ferry remarked: These are very beautiful poems, and The Net is a very beautiful book” that displays “an extraordinary capacity for using his resources as a poet through his command of diction and idiom, and through his versification.” “The whole book is a master class in craft,” remarked Jill Alexander Essbaum. The book-length poem From Nothing, on the life of Jesuit priest and physicist, George LeMaitre, won the Julia Ward Howe Award and is part of a proposed three book trilogy.  On From Nothing, Emily Grosholz reflects, “the poet draws the weft of scientific vocabulary through the warp of everyday speech.”  “In From Nothing,” Alan Shapiro declared, “Tobin brings his learning and astounding imaginative powers to bear on such central questions as the origin and end of the universe… a memorable, powerful and moving book that should be read by everyone who wonders how we got here and what our being here can mean.”  Stepehn Schneider called The Stone in the Air, Tobin's suite of translations from the German of Paul Celan, “compelling and haunting, a testimony to the power of language and poetry to confront the unspeakable.”  The New York Times named Blood Labors one of the Best Poetry Books of the Year.  “Blood Labors is an ebullient and ecclesiastical wonder, capturing more of creation, the uncreated, and the recreated than any dozen books on a poetry bookshelf,” Barbara Ras commented, “[it] dazzles with its brilliance.”

Reception of Scholarship and Essays 
Daniel Tobin has published numerous essays on poetry and poetics in journals like The Writer’s Chronicle, New Hibernia Review, Befrois, and Etudes Irlandais, and others, many of which have been reprinted in essay collections such as The Measured Word and Complexities of Motion. His book, Passage to the Center: Imagination and the Sacred in the Poetry of Seamus Heaney, is regarded as the foremost study of religious motifs in Irish the Nobel laureate's work. His essay “Beyond Maps and Atlases: Transfiguration and Immanence in the Later Poems of Seamus Heaney” takes up the subject in Heaney's later work, and appears with essays by other major Heaney scholars in “The Soul Exceeds its circumstances: The Later Poetry of Seamus Heaney, edited by Eugene O’Brien. Awake in America appeared in 2011, also to wide praise.  “This incisive and moving critique of poetry and tradition pushes the frontiers of Irish Studies,” Joseph Lennon observed, and it challenges “scholars and readers to survey a new country of Irishness, at once inner, ardent and textual.” In On Serious Earth: Poetry and Transcendence, Tobin takes on the largest questions of meaning and durability of language turned to art in the wake of postmodernism.  Rosanna Warren called it “a complex, sophisticated, and magnanimous book,” and Bruce Bond hailed it as a book of “unflinching sobriety and daring [in a] conversation too often shrill with hyperbole or lackluster with a chronic failure to commit... a smart and beautiful book.”

Editorial Work 
Tobin's The Book of Irish American Poetry from the Eighteenth Century to the Present is recognized internationally as the definitive volume of its kind. With its publication, Smurfit Professor of Irish Studies, Eamonn Wall, credited Tobin with “the invention of a whole new field.” Light in Hand: The Selected Early Poems of Lola Ridge, brought to new light the work of the transnational feminist, leftist poet after decades of neglect. The Poetry Society of the United Kingdom awarded his later edited volume, To the Many: The Collected Early Works of Lola Ridge, a Special Commendation. Poet’s Work, Poet’s Play: Essays on the Practice and the Art (with poet Pimone Triplett) brings together craft essays from the faculty of the Program for Writers at Warren Wilson College, with all royalties donated to the philanthropic organization Friends of Writers to support the Holden Diversity Scholarships, among other awards for adult writers.

Awards
2018 Best Poetry Books of 2018, New York Times, for Blood Labors
2018 Honor Book, Massachusetts Book Awards for From Nothing
2018 Verse Daily (Featured Poem) "Post-Orpheus" from The Stone in the Air
2018 Stephen J. Meringoff Poetry Award for "This Broken Symmetry"
2018 Special Commendation (Poetry Society UK) for To the Many: Collected Early Works of Lola Ridge (editor)
2018 Pushcart Prize for "The White Road"
2017 Julia Ward Howe Book Prize for From Nothing (Boston Authors Club)
2016 Verse Daily (Featured Poem) "Cove" from From Nothing
2014 Poetry Daily (Featured Poems) "BB" and "In Wax and Fire"
2012 Best American Poetry "The Turnpike"
2012 Poetry Daily (Featured Poem) "Frond" 
2011 The Massachusetts Book Award in Poetry for Belated Heavens
2011 Arthur Loftus Award for Outstanding Achievement in Arts and Letters, Iona College
2011 Four Way Books Fellow
2011 Massachusetts Poetry Festival "Must Read Book" for Belated Heavens
2010 Poetry Daily (Featured Book) for Belated Heavens "Lawn Thatching on Holy Saturday"
2010 Massachusetts Cultural Council Grant (finalist)
2009 Guggenheim Fellow
2008 Outstanding Book for 2008: The Book of Irish American Poetry from the Eighteenth Century to the Present (American Association of School Librarians, University Press Book Committee, The public Library Association)
2008 Poetry Daily (Featured Book) Second Things "A Cone of the Eucalyptus" 
2006 Pushcart Prize: Special Mention
2006 Poetry Daily (Featured Poem) "As Angels in Some Brighter Dreams" 
2006 Foreword Poetry Book of the Year for The Narrows"
2005 Poetry Daily (Featured Book) The Narrows "Near Hag's Head"
2005 Artist of the Month (June) Image Journal2004 Poet of the Month  (December) Poetry.net
2004 Verse Daily (Featured Poem) "To Acedia"
2002 The Robert Penn Warren Award The Cumberland Poetry Review (1st Place)
2001 Yankee Poetry Prize Yankee Magazine (2nd Place)
2000 The Donn Goodwin Poetry Prize Irish American Post 
2000 The Robert Penn Warren Award The Cumberland Poetry Review (2nd Place)
2000 The Greensboro Review Poetry Prize
1999 Robert Frost Fellowship
1999 Irish American Cultural Institute, Research Award
1998 Katherine Bakeless Nason Prize in Poetry, Bread Loaf/University Press of New England
1998 The Robert Penn Warren Award The Cumberland Poetry Review (finalist)
1998 Vermont Studio Center Fellowship in Poetry
1997 Ali Dor-Ner Fellowship in Poetry
1996 Creative Writing Fellowship, National Endowment for the Arts
1996 International Merit Award, The Atlanta Review
1995 The Discovery/The Nation Award, Unterberg Poetry Center
1995 Bread Loaf Scholarship, Bread Loaf Writers Conference
Robert Penn Warren Award 
Robert Frost Fellowship
The Discovery/The Nation Award
National Endowment for the Arts Fellowship

Works
"The Country", The Courtland Review, Issue 29, Summer 2005
 Where the World is Made, University Press of New England, 1999, 
 Double Life, Louisiana State University Press, 2004, 
 The Narrows Four Way Books, 2005,  
 Second Things Four Way Books, 2008, 
 Belated Heavens Four Way Books, 2010 
 The Net Four Way Books, 2014 
 From Nothing Four Way Books, 2016 
 Blood Labors Four Way Books, 2018 
 The Stone in the Air: A Suite of Forty Poems, Versions of Paul Celan Salmon Poetry, 2018

Criticism

Critical Studies and EssaysPassage to the Center: Imagination and the Sacred in the Poetry of Seamus Heaney University of Kentucky Press (1999) Awake in America: An Inquiry into Irish American Poetry, University of Notre Dame Press (2011) On Serious Earth, Orison Books (2019)

EditorTo the Many: Collected Early Poems of Lola Ridge Little Island Press 2018The Book of Irish American Poetry from the Eighteenth Century to the Present University Press of Notre Dame 2008Light in Hand: Selected Early Poems of Lola Ridge Quale Press 2007Poet's Work, Poet's Play: Essays on the Practice and the Art'' University of Michigan Press 2007

External links
Author's website"

American male poets
Emerson College faculty
Iona University alumni
Harvard Divinity School alumni
Warren Wilson College alumni
University of Virginia alumni
Living people
1958 births